The 47th United States Colored Infantry Regiment was a U.S.C.T. infantry regiment of the Union Army during the American Civil War. It was organized from the 8th Louisiana Infantry (African Descent) in March 1864. Commanded by Colonel Hiram Scofield, it fought in Mississippi and Florida, including at the Battle of Fort Blakely in April 1865. The regiment was mustered out on January 5, 1866. During the war it lost one officer and thirty enlisted men either killed or mortally wounded and three officers and 398 enlisted men by disease, for a total of 432.

See also
List of United States Colored Troops Civil War units

Sources
 Lest We Forget website page

United States Colored Troops Civil War units and formations
Military units and formations established in 1864
1864 establishments in Louisiana
Military units and formations disestablished in 1866